Susan Gay Golder (née Haden, born 29 April 1946) is a former New Zealand athlete and track cyclist.

At the 1974 British Commonwealth Games she won the  silver medal in the women's 800 metres. As a track cyclist, Golder won the bronze medal in the women's sprint at the 1990 Commonwealth Games.

She competed at the 1972 Summer Olympics in athletics, finishing 4th in her heat of the 800 metres.

References

 
 
Sue's brother is former All Black (1972-1985), Andy Haden

External links
 

1946 births
Living people
New Zealand female middle-distance runners
New Zealand female cyclists
Athletes (track and field) at the 1972 Summer Olympics
Athletes (track and field) at the 1974 British Commonwealth Games
Cyclists at the 1990 Commonwealth Games
Olympic athletes of New Zealand
Commonwealth Games silver medallists for New Zealand
Commonwealth Games bronze medallists for New Zealand
Commonwealth Games medallists in cycling
Commonwealth Games medallists in athletics
Athletes from Christchurch
Cyclists from Christchurch
20th-century New Zealand women
Medallists at the 1990 Commonwealth Games